Pedro Bispo, known as Bispo (born 12 April 1992), is a Portuguese rapper. On the 16th of January 2020, Bispo announced that he started his own record label, Mentalidade Free, signing Ivandro as his first artist. They collaborated in the song 'Essa Saia', that has now more than 15 million streams on Spotify.

Discography

EP's

Albums

Singles

As lead artist

As featured artist

Awards

References 

Living people
21st-century Portuguese male singers
1992 births
People from Sintra
Portuguese rappers